In mathematics, Lawson's conjecture states that the Clifford torus is the only minimally embedded torus in the 3-sphere S3. The conjecture was featured by the Australian Mathematical Society Gazette as part of the Millennium Problems series.

In March 2012, Simon Brendle gave a proof of this conjecture, based on maximum principle techniques.

References

Geometric topology
Theorems in differential geometry
Conjectures that have been proved
Theorems in topology